Axel Nils August Nordlander (21 September 1879 – 30 April 1962) was a Swedish officer and horse rider. He competed at the 1912 Summer Olympics and won the individual and team eventing competitions.

References

External links

 

1879 births
1962 deaths
Swedish event riders
Equestrians at the 1912 Summer Olympics
Olympic equestrians of Sweden
Swedish male equestrians
Olympic gold medalists for Sweden
Olympic medalists in equestrian
People from Smedjebacken Municipality
Swedish Army officers
Medalists at the 1912 Summer Olympics
Sportspeople from Dalarna County
20th-century Swedish people